Leon Shore (July 10, 1892 – December 25, 1942) was an American fencer. He competed in the team épée event at the 1924 Summer Olympics.

References

External links
 

1892 births
1942 deaths
American male épée fencers
Olympic fencers of the United States
Fencers at the 1924 Summer Olympics
People from Washington, D.C.
American military personnel of World War I